Wynand Havenga (born 6 September 1965) is a South African former professional darts player.

Career

He made his television debut at the 2007 PDC World Darts Championship as a qualifier, having beaten almost 100 players to win the South African Masters and thus earn his place at the Circus Tavern. He beat Steve Maish in the first round and then conquered established pro Peter Manley in round two, but bowed out in the last 16 to Darren Webster. Havenga became a popular figure during the World Championship, his unique celebrations while winning a leg, or even hitting a 180, led comparisons to Cliff Lazarenko and a fan-base, who call themselves the "Havenga Boys". However, he has since struggled with a shoulder injury and his ranking has since fallen to 500, after the £8,500 he earned at Circus Tavern, was wiped off in 2009 due to the two-year-cyclical rule of the PDC Order of Merit.

Outside darts, he is a business manager for a motor dealer and has recently joined Unicorn Darts. He also launched his own steel and soft-tip 19 gram darts made from a 90% tungsten-nickel alloy.

World Championship results

PDC
2007: Third round (lost to Darren Webster 2–4) (sets)

References

External links
Profile and stats on Darts Database

1965 births
Living people
South African darts players
Professional Darts Corporation associate players
Sportspeople from Cape Town